The 1994–95 Botola is the 39th season of the Moroccan Premier League. COD Meknès are the holders of the title.

References

Morocco 1994–95

Botola seasons
Morocco
Botola